The 1978–79 English football season was Aston Villa's 79th in the Football League and their fourth consecutive season in the top division. Manager, Ron Saunders had signed a six-year contract in the pre-season.

Diary of the season
19 Aug 1978: The First Division season begins with a 1–0 home victory over Wolves.

8 May 1979: Liverpool beat Aston Villa 3–0 at Anfield to clinch the First Division title.

League table

Squad

References

Aston Villa F.C. seasons
Aston Villa F.C. season